Stephen Nsereko (born July 20, 1986) is a Ugandan retired footballer.

Career

College and amateur
Nsereko attended Buganda College in his native Uganda, and played professionally for Villa Kampala in the Ugandan Super League, before moving to the United States in 2006 to attend and play college soccer at Winthrop University. He was selected as the 2006 Big South Conference Freshman of the Year, was named to the Big South Conference All-Freshmen Team, and was selected by CollegeSoccerNews as one of the Top 100 Freshmen in 2006, and went on to be a Three Time All-Big South Conference and All-South Atlantic Region.

Nsereko also played with the Hampton Roads Piranhas and the Fredericksburg Gunners in the USL Premier Development League.

Professional
Nsereko turned professional in 2010 when he signed with the Richmond Kickers of the USL Second Division. He made his debut for the team on May 16, 2010 in a game against Real Maryland Monarchs.

International
Nsereko is a full member of the Uganda national football team; he appeared in three of his country's games in the qualifying tournament for the 2006 FIFA World Cup, against Burkina Faso, Ghana and Cape Verde.

References

External links
 
 
 

1986 births
Living people
Ugandan footballers
Uganda international footballers
SC Villa players
Winthrop Eagles men's soccer players
Virginia Beach Piranhas players
Fredericksburg Gunners players
Richmond Kickers players
USL League Two players
USL Second Division players
Association football midfielders
Sportspeople from Kampala